Giovanni Baronzio, also known as Giovanni da Rimini, (died before 1362), was an Italian painter who was active in Romagna and the Marche region during the second quarter of the 14th century. His year of birth is unknown.  Giovanni Baronzio was the eminent representative of the second generation of painters of the school of Rimini who were influenced in by the activity of Giotto in Rimini.

Life
The name Johannes Barontius appears in the signature of a polyptych representing the Madonna and Child Enthroned with Saints (Galleria Nazionale delle Marche, Palazzo Ducale, Urbino).  The work was originally placed in the church of San Francesco at Macerata Feltria. Usually, Barontius (which is the Latinized form of Baronzio) is a surname.  However, from a document of 1362, which records the painter's tomb in the church of San Giuliano in Rimini it is clear that it was a patronymic. The only documentary evidence on the artist to date is a deed dated 1343 that cites “Iohanne Baroncio pictore” as a witness.

Based on the style of the painter, who may have been a disciple of Giotto but at second hand, Baronzio must have started his career around 1320 or a little later.

Work
The  polyptych  representing the Madonna and Child Enthroned with Saints (Galleria Nazionale delle Marche, Palazzo Ducale, Urbino) is the only secure basis for reconstructing his oeuvre. His Scenes from the Life of Christ (mid 1340s, Metropolitan Museum of Art) shows that Baronzio was a competent craftsman using a delicate range of colours.  He also appears to have followed established Riminese iconography. Baronzio paid much attention to detail and used chromatic effects and decorative patterns as was common in the ossified traditions of the local school in its later stages.

Baronzio is one of several fourteenth-century painters from Rimini, others being Giuliano, Pietro and Giovanni. The work of the Rimini school was influenced by Giotto who had visited and worked in Rimini.

References

External links

14th-century Italian painters
Italian male painters
1362 deaths
People from Rimini
Gothic painters
Year of birth unknown